Saint-Cuthbert (Ulm Québec) Aerodrome  is located  northwest Saint-Cuthbert, Quebec, Canada.

References

Registered aerodromes in Lanaudière